The Four Hills of Kowloon are four hills that were historically the site of granite quarries in Kwun Tong District, New Kowloon, Hong Kong.

History
At the end of the 18th century, Hakka settled into the Cha Kwo Ling area, and quarrying became their main occupation. By that time, the villages of Cha Kwo Ling, Ngau Tau Kok, Sai Tso Wan and Lei Yue Mun were collectively called Sze Shan ("Four  Hills"). According to a missionary who visited the area in 1844, tens of quarries were in operation along the two miles stretch in eastern Kowloon. In the early 20th century there were said to be more than 10 quarries in the Ngau Tau Kok section of the "Four Hills" alone, each employing 10 to 20 people, all Hakka with origins in the East River area of northeastern Guangdong.

The Qing government appointed a headman for each "hill", in charge of ruling the area and collecting tax. The four headmen were collectively referred to as the Sze Shan Tau Yan ("Headmen of Four Hills"). The four villages also formed the Sze Shan Kung So ("Communal  Hall  of  Four  Hills"), managing the quarrying  business. The headmen system ended before World War II.

The granite blocks extracted from the Four Hills were exported via sailboat, and several piers were built along the coast. The one at Sai Tso Wan was the biggest. Today, only parts of the Lei Yue Mun pier remain.

Conservation
The Old Quarry Site Structures at Lei Yue Mun (Kowloon) have been listed as Grade III historic buildings.

See also
 Mining in Hong Kong
 Sacred Heart Cathedral (Guangzhou), built with granite from the Four hills of Kowloon.
 Choi Hei Road Park, Choi Fook Estate, Choi Tak Estate and Choi Ying Estate in Ngau Tau Kok, a granite theme park and a public housing estates built on the site of the former Ping Shan Quarry.

References

Further reading

External links

 Antiquities Advisory Board. Historic Building Appraisal. Old Quarry Site Structures, Lei Yue Mun, Kwun Tong, Kowloon Pictures
 Planning Review on Development of Ex-Cha Kwo Ling Kaolin Mine Site (2013)
 Planning Review on Development of Ex-Cha Kwo Ling Kaolin Mine Site (final report)
 Four Hills Elementary School, Cha Kwo Ling at industrialhistoryhk.org
 Moving Mountains: the Life and Mines of Ko Ming-fan at industrialhistoryhk.org
 
 RTHK: Hong Kong Connection. "茶果嶺的餘暉".
 RTHK: Hong Kong Connection. "茶果嶺的餘暉".

New Kowloon
Mountains, peaks and hills of Hong Kong
Kwun Tong District